Penn Simham is a 1986 Indian Malayalam-language film, directed by Crossbelt Mani and produced by SR Enterprises. The film stars Ratheesh, Anuradha, Kuthiravattam Pappu and Silk Smitha. The film has musical score by Guna Singh.

Cast
Ratheesh
Anuradha
Kuthiravattam Pappu
Silk Smitha

Soundtrack
The music was composed by Guna Singh with lyrics by Sreekumaran Thampi.

References

External links
 

1986 films
1980s Malayalam-language films